Year 1312 (MCCCXII) was a leap year starting on Saturday (link will display the full calendar) of the Julian calendar.

Events 
 By place 

 Europe 
 June 15 – Battle of Rozgony: Hungarian forces led by King Charles I defeat the family of Palatine Amadeus Aba near Rozgony. During the battle, Charles losses his royal standard, but is reinforced by German mercenaries from Košice (or Kassa). The rebel army is routed, and Charles extends his power base in Hungary. His position is secured and resistance (reduced by the magnates' opposition) against Charles' rule comes to an end.
 June 29 – Henry VII is crowned emperor of the Holy Roman Empire in the Lateran Palace (St Peter's Basilica is occupied by Romans hostile to him). Later, Henry abandons his campaign against Florence on October 31.
 September 7 – King Ferdinand IV (the Summoned) dies after a 17-year reign and is succeeded by his 1-year-old son Alfonso XI (the Avenger) as ruler of Castile. His mother, Queen Constance, becomes his co-regent.
 September 27 – The Charter of Kortenberg is signed, and is possibly the first constitution which allows democratic decisions in feudal mainland Europe.
 Battle of Amorgos: A Hospitaller fleet intercepts and destroys a Turkish fleet near the island of Amorgos. During the battle, all 23 Turkish ships are burnt.
 Winter – Battle of Gallipoli: A combined Byzantine-Serbian force (supported by a Genoese fleet) defeats the Turcopoles (some 2,000 men) at Gallipoli.

 England 
 January 13 – Piers Gaveston returns in secret at Knaresborough Castle after an exile of two months. King Edward II restores all the promised lands to him, they travel to Scotland to seek help from King Robert the Bruce.
 May 4 – Edward II and Piers Gaveston are at Newcastle when they are alerted to the news of an English force under Henry Percy and Robert Clifford is heading for them. They manage to escape to Scarborough Castle. 
 May – English forces under Aymer de Valence besiege Scarborough Castle. After a couple of weeks, Piers Gaveston surrenders on May 19. In terms of surrender, Aymer gives his word that Gaveston will not be harmed. 
 June – Piers Gaveston is taken hostage by Guy de Beauchamp and is put in a dungeon at Warwick Castle. He is condemned to death and taken to Leek Wootton (or Blacklow Hill), where Piers is executed on June 19.

 Middle East 
 Öljaitü of the Ilkhanate briefly raids into Syria. He withdrew in the same year, ending the Mongol invasions of the LevantJosef W. Meri, "Medieval Islamic Civilization," page 573

 Africa 
 Musa I (or Mansa Musa) becomes ruler of the Mali Empire, guiding his realm through its prosperous years, enhancing trade, expanding borders and sponsoring mosques (approximate date). 

 By topic 

 Exploration 
 The Canary Islands are "rediscovered" by Lancelotto Malocello, Genoese navigator, who sails to Lanzarote, and remains there for almost two decades.

 Religion 
 March 22 – Pope Clement V, under pressure from King Philip IV (the Fair), officially disbands the Order of the Knights Templar at the Council of Vienne. The Order's property and monetary assets are given to a rival order, the Knights Hospitaller. Meanwhile, Jacques de Molay, last Grand Master of the Knights Templar, is held in prison in Paris, where he is forced to commit false confessions.

Births 
 September 17 – William Donn de Burgh, Irish nobleman (d. 1333)
 November 13 – Edward III, king of England and Ireland (d. 1377)
 William II, Latin prince and knight (House of Barcelona) (d. 1338)

Deaths 
 January 23 – Isabella of Villehardouin, Latin princess (b. 1263)
 March 9 – Beatrice, French noblewoman and co-ruler (b. 1249)
 March 10 – Casimir of Bytom, Polish nobleman (House of Piast)
 May 1 – Paul I, Croatian nobleman, knight and oligarch (b. 1245)
 May 13 – Theobald II (or Thiebaut), German nobleman (b. 1263)
 June 19 – Piers Gaveston, English nobleman and knight (b. 1284)
 August 27 – Angelo da Foligno (or Conti), Italian priest (b. 1226)
 September 7 – Ferdinand IV, king of Castile and León (b. 1285)
 October 27
 Gentile Portino da Montefiore, Italian cardinal-priest (b. 1240)
 John II (the Peaceful), Dutch nobleman and knight (b. 1275)
 October 28 – Elisabeth of Carinthia, queen of Germany (b. 1262)
 October 29 – Landolfo Brancaccio, Italian aristocrat and cardinal
 November 2 – Afonso of Portugal, Portuguese prince (b. 1263)
 November 6 – Christina von Stommeln, German nun (b. 1242)
 November 9 – Mujū Dōkyō, Japanese Buddhist monk (b. 1227)
 December 7 – Michael II, Syrian Orthodox patriarch of Antioch
 December 13 – John the Parricide, German nobleman (b. 1290)
 Eschiva of Ibelin, Outremer noblewoman and co-ruler (b. 1253)
 Guido della Torre, Italian nobleman and rebel leader (b. 1259)
 Malatesta da Verucchio, Italian nobleman and knight (b. 1212)
 Reginald le Chen, Scottish nobleman and high sheriff (b. 1235)
 Siemowit of Dobrzyń, Polish prince and knight (House of Piast)
 Valdemar IV, Danish nobleman and knight (House of Estridsen)
 Xenia of Tarusa, Russian noblewoman and princess (b. 1246)
 Zayn al-Din al-Amidi, Arab scholar, academic, jurist and writer

References